The mahi-mahi or common dolphinfish (Coryphaena hippurus) is a surface-dwelling ray-finned fish found in off-shore temperate, tropical, and subtropical waters worldwide. Also widely called dorado (not to be confused with Salminus brasiliensis, a fresh water fish) and dolphin, it is one of two members of the family Coryphaenidae, the other being the pompano dolphinfish. These fish are most commonly found in the waters around the Gulf of Mexico, Costa Rica,  Hawaii and the Indian Ocean.

Nomenclature 

The name mahi-mahi comes from the Hawaiian language and means "very strong", through the process of reduplication. However in Māori, a sister language of Hawaiian, "mahimahi" almost exclusively refers to the verb meaning to have sex. By chance in Persian, mahi (ماهی) means fish, but the word mahi in Hawaiian has nothing to do with the Persian language. Though the species is also referred to as the common dolphinfish, the use of "dolphin" can be misleading as they are not related to dolphins; see Coryphaena for the possible etymologies of "dolphinfish". In parts of the Pacific and along the English-speaking coast of South Africa, the mahi-mahi is commonly referred to by its name in Spanish, dorado. In the Mediterranean island of Malta, the mahi-mahi is referred to as the lampuka.

Linnaeus named the genus, derived from the Greek word, κορυφή, koryphe, meaning top or apex, in 1758. Synonyms for the species include Coryphaena argyrurus, Coryphaena chrysurus, and Coryphaena dolfyn.

Description

Mahi-mahi have compressed bodies and a single long-based dorsal fin extending from the head almost to the tail. Mature males have prominent foreheads protruding well above the body proper. Females have a rounded head. Their caudal fins and anal fins are sharply concave. They are distinguished by dazzling colors - golden on the sides, and bright blues and greens on the sides and back. The pectoral fins of the mahi-mahi are iridescent blue. The flank is broad and golden.
Out of the water, the fish often change color (giving rise to their Spanish name, dorado, "golden"), going through several hues before finally fading to a muted yellow-grey upon death.

Mahi-mahi can live for up to five years, although they seldom exceed four. Females are usually smaller than males. Mahi-mahi are among the fastest-growing of fish. They spawn in warm ocean currents throughout much of the year, and their young are commonly found in rafts of Sargassum weeds. Young Mahi Mahi  migrate past Malta where they are called Lampuki and Sicily where they are known as Lampuga or Capone; there they are fished using nets and  floating mats of palm leaves under which they collect.

Mahi-mahi are carnivorous, feeding on flying fish, crabs, squid, mackerel, and other forage fish. They have also been known to eat zooplankton.

Males and females are sexually mature in their first year, usually by the age of 4–5 months. Females may spawn two to three times per year, and produce between 80,000 and 1,000,000 eggs per event. In waters at 28 °C/83 °F, mahi-mahi larvae are found year-round, with greater numbers detected in spring and fall.
Mahi-mahi fish are mostly found in the surface water. Their flesh is grey-white when raw, cooking to an attractive white with a clean, non-fishy flavour. The body is slightly slender and long, making them fast swimmers; they can swim as fast as 50 knots (92.6 km/h, 57.5 mph).

Recreational fishing 

Mahi-mahi are highly sought for sport fishing and commercial purposes. Sport fishermen seek them due to their beauty, size, food quality, and healthy population. Mahi-mahi can be found in the Caribbean Sea, on the west coast of North and South America, the Pacific coast of Costa Rica, the Gulf of Mexico, the Atlantic coast of Florida and West Africa, Indian Ocean, Bay of Bengal, South China Sea and Southeast Asia, Hawaii, Tahiti, and many other places worldwide.

Mahi-mahi (and many other fish) often swim near debris such as floating wood, five-gallon bucket lids, palm trees and fronds, or sargasso weed lines and around fish buoys. Frigatebirds search for food accompanying the debris or sargasso. Experienced fishing guides can tell what species are likely around the debris by the birds' behavior.

 gear is more than adequate when trolling for mahi-mahi. Fly-casters may especially seek frigatebirds to find big mahi-mahis, and then use a bait-and-switch technique. Ballyhoo or a net full of live sardines tossed into the water can excite the mahi-mahis into a feeding frenzy. Hookless teaser lures can have the same effect. After tossing the teasers or live chum, fishermen throw the fly to the feeding mahi-mahi. Once on a line, mahi-mahi are fast, flashy, and acrobatic, with beautiful blue, yellow, green, and even red dots of color.

Commercial fishing 
The United States and the Caribbean countries are the primary consumers of this fish, but many European countries are increasing their consumption every year. It is a popular food fish in Australia, usually caught and sold as a byproduct by tuna and swordfish commercial fishing operators. Japan and Hawaii are significant consumers. The Arabian Sea, particularly the coast of Oman, also has mahi-mahi. At first, mahi-mahi were mostly bycatch in the tuna and swordfish longline fishery. Now, they are sought by commercial fishermen on their own merits.

In French Polynesia, fishermen use harpoons, using a specifically designed boat, the poti marara, to pursue it, because mahi-mahi do not dive. The poti marara is a powerful motorized V-shaped boat, optimized for high agility and speed, and driven with a stick so the pilot can hold his harpoon with his right hand. The method is also practiced by fishermen in the Philippines, especially in the northern province of Batanes, where the harpooning is called pagmamamataw.

Environmental and food safety concerns 
Depending on how it is caught, mahi-mahi is classed differently by various sustainability rating systems:

 The Monterey Bay Aquarium classifies mahi-mahi, when caught in the US Atlantic, as a best choice, the top of its three environmental-impact categories. The aquarium advises to avoid imported mahi-mahi harvested by long line, but rates troll and pole-and-line caught as a good alternative.
 The Natural Resources Defense Council classifies mahi-mahi as a "moderate mercury" fish (its second-lowest of four categories), and suggests eating six servings or fewer per month.
 The Environmental Defense Fund  classifies mahi-mahi caught by line/pole in the US as "Eco-Best" in its three-category system, but classifies all mahi-mahi caught by longline as only "Eco-OK" or "Eco-Worst" due to longline "high levels [of] bycatch, injuring or killing seabirds, sea turtles and sharks."

The mahi-mahi is also a common vector for ciguatera poisoning. Although a very popular food dish in many parts of the world, there have been reports of ciguatera poisoning from human consumption of this fish. Ciguatera poisoning is caused by the accumulation of toxins (ciguatoxins and maitotoxin) in the flesh of the fish over time. These are produced by Gambierdiscus toxicus which grows together with marine algae, which causes fish like the mahi-mahi to consume them by accident.

Mahi-mahi naturally have high levels of histidine, which is converted to histamine when bacterial growth occurs during improper storage or processing. Subsequent cooking, smoking, or freezing does not eliminate the histamine. This leads to a foodborne illness known as scombroid food poisoning, which also affect other fish such as tuna, mackerel, sardine, anchovy, herring, bluefish, amberjack and marlin. Symptoms are those of histamine intolerance and may include flushed skin, headache, itchiness, blurred vision, abdominal cramps, and diarrhea., and the onset of symptoms is typically 10 to 60 minutes after eating and can last for up to two days. Rarely, breathing problems (like that of allergic asthma) or an irregular heartbeat may occur. Diagnosis is typically based on the symptoms and may be supported by a normal blood tryptase.

References

Further reading
 Atlantic Mahi Mahi NOAA FishWatch. Retrieved 11 November 2012.
 Pacific Mahi Mahi NOAA FishWatch. Retrieved 11 November 2012.

External links 

 
 Dolphinfish Monterey Bay Aquarium
 Oceana's Sustainable Seafood Guide
 Dolphinfish Florida Museum
 Dolphinfishes from iNaturalist

Commercial fish
mahi-mahi
Fish described in 1758
Taxa named by Carl Linnaeus
Fish of the Atlantic Ocean
Hawaiian cuisine
Hawaiian words and phrases
Pantropical fish
Sport fish
Cuisine of the Southern United States